Omicron Cassiopeiae (ο Cas, ο Cassiopeiae) is a triple star system in the constellation Cassiopeia. It is approximately 700 light-years from Earth, based on its parallax. It is visible to the naked eye with a slightly variable apparent magnitude of about 4.5.

The primary component, ο Cassiopeiae A, is a spectroscopic binary, and its close companion completes one orbit every 2.83 years (1,031.55 days). The system has also been resolved with interferometry.

The primary of this spectroscopic binary is a blue-white B-type giant star. It is classified as a Gamma Cassiopeiae variable and its brightness varies from magnitude 4.30 to 4.62. It is rotating at a speed of 375 km/s at its equator (close to its theoretical break-up velocity of 390 km/s), although because the pole is inclined 36 degrees, its projected rotational velocity is only 220 km/s. The nature of the secondary is not well known. Despite the fact that the secondary is 2.9 magnitudes dimmer than the primary, the secondary appears to have a mass similar to, or even larger than primary. It is possible that the secondary is a pair of early A-type main-sequence stars.

A more distant companion, ο Cassiopeiae B, lies 33.6 arcseconds away. It is an eleventh-magnitude, F-type main-sequence star. Because it has a similar proper motion to the central system, it is assumed to be gravitationally bound.

References

Cassiopeiae, Omicron
Cassiopeiae, 22
B-type giants
F-type main-sequence stars
Cassiopeia (constellation)
Gamma Cassiopeiae variable stars
Triple star systems
Spectroscopic binaries
004180
003504
0193
Durchmusterung objects